Mount Kwaraha is a mountain in central Tanzania.

The mountain has numerous springs and streams which flow west into Lake Babati and east into the Tarangire River.

The mountain has mist forests above  elevation, and is home to small numbers of elephants and buffalo, and large numbers of birds and monkeys.

References

Geography of Manyara Region
Inselbergs of Africa
Kwaraha
Southern Eastern Rift